The moss-backed tanager (Bangsia edwardsi) is a species of bird in the family Thraupidae.
It is found in Colombia and Ecuador.
Its natural habitats are subtropical or tropical moist lowland forests and subtropical or tropical moist montane forests.

References

Birds of South America
moss-backed tanager
Birds of the Colombian Andes
Birds of the Ecuadorian Andes
moss-backed tanager
Taxonomy articles created by Polbot